Bangana is a genus of fish in the family Cyprinidae, the carps and minnows. It is distributed across much of southern and eastern Asia. Species live mainly in the flowing waters of tropical and subtropical rivers.

Taxonomy and species
Bangana includes many species formerly classified in the genus Sinilabeo. A number of species often placed in Bangana have again been moved to other genera, notably Altigena, Gymnostomus, Incisilabeo, Speolabeo and Vinalabeo, but to what extent these changes are recognized varies.

According to FishBase, there are 21 species in Bangana, but some of these (marked with a star* in list) are placed in Altigena, Gymnostomus or Incisilabeo by Catalog of Fishes, which however recognizes Bangana nukta  (Sykes, 1839) — a species placed in Schismatorhynchos by FishBase.

 Bangana almorae (B. L. Chaudhuri, 1912)
 Bangana ariza* (Hamilton, 1807) – reba
 Bangana behri* (Fowler, 1937)
 Bangana brevirostris Liu & Zhou, 2009
 Bangana decora (W. K. H. Peters, 1881)
 Bangana dero (Hamilton, 1822) – kalabans
 Bangana devdevi (Hora, 1936)
 Bangana diplostoma (Heckel, 1838)
 Bangana discognathoides* (Nichols & C. H. Pope, 1927)
 Bangana elegans* Kottelat, 1998
 Bangana gedrosicus (Zugmayer, 1912)
 Bangana lemassoni (Pellegrin & Chevey, 1936)
 Bangana lippus* (Fowler, 1936)
 Bangana rendahli (Sh. Kimura, 1934)
 Bangana sinkleri* (Fowler, 1934)
 Bangana tonkinensis* (Pellegrin & Chevey, 1934)
 Bangana tungting (Nichols, 1925)
 Bangana wui* (C. Y. Zheng & Y. R. Chen, 1983)
 Bangana xanthogenys (Pellegrin & Chevey, 1936)
 Bangana yunnanensis* (Wu, et al., 1977)
 Bangana zhui* (Zheng & Chen, 1989)

References

 
Cyprinidae genera
Cyprinid fish of Asia